Professor John Stewart Cameron  (born 1934), known as Stewart, is a British nephrologist.

Cameron undertook his medical training at Guy's Hospital and spent the large part of his career there and at King's College Medical School, into which it was merged. He eventually became professor of renal medicine.

While at Cornell University in 1962, he became interested in dialysis. He has also worked on kidney transplantation, and has written on the history of nephrology. He was president of the European Society of Paediatric Nephrology from 1975–98, the European Renal Association - European Dialysis and Transplant Association (ERA/EDTA) from 1984–87, the UK Renal Association from 1992–95, and the International Society of Nephrology (ISN) from 1993–1995. He retired from active clinical practice in 1996. He gave the Lumleian Lectures in 1997.

He was made a Commander of the Order of the British Empire (CBE) in the 1998 New Year Honours, "For services to Nephrology", and has been elected a Fellow of the Royal College of Physicians (FRCP). He was awarded the Jean Hamburger Award of the ISN in 2003, and the David M. Hume Award of the National Kidney Foundation (NKF) in 2004.

References

External links 

 

Place of birth missing (living people)
Place of death missing
Commanders of the Order of the British Empire
British nephrologists
20th-century British medical doctors
1934 births
Living people